Cardiac Arrest was a British medical drama series made by World Productions for BBC1. It first broadcast between 1994 and 1996. The series was controversial owing to its cynical depiction of doctors, nurses, and the National Health Service (NHS), although it has often topped polls of the UK medical profession as the most realistic medical drama of all time.

The series was created by Jed Mercurio (writing under the pseudonym John MacUre), a former junior doctor who had worked at a hospital in Wolverhampton. Mercurio drew on his experience to provide a more visceral, albeit wryly humorous, look at the NHS in the 1990s. At the time of airing, Mercurio was still working as a doctor. Mercurio later went on to create another controversial medical drama for the BBC in 2004, Bodies.

Cast

Doctors
 Andrew Lancel as Dr Andrew Collin 
 Helen Baxendale as Dr Claire Maitland 
 Ace Bhatti as Dr Rajesh Rajah 
 Jonathan Dow as Dr James Mortimer 
 Michael MacKenzie as Dr Graham Turner 
 Tom Watson as Mr Ernest Docherty
 Andrew Clover as Dr Phil Kirkby (series 2–3)
 Peter O'Brien as Mr Cyril 'Scissors' Smedley (series 2–3)
 Jack Fortune as Mr Adrian DeVries (series 2–3)
 Pooky Quesnel as Dr Monica Broome (series 1)
 Danny Webb as Mr Simon Betancourt (series 1) 
 Fred Pearson as Dr Barry Yates (series 2)
 Caroline Trowbridge as Dr Liz Reid (series 3)
 Selina Cadell as Dr Sarah Hudson (series 3)

Admin staff
 Nicholas Palliser as Paul Tennant (series 2–3)
 Angela Douglas as Mrs Isobel Trimble (series 2–3)

Sisters
 Ellen Thomas as Sister Jackie Landers 
 Melanie Hill as Sister Pamela Lockley (series 1)
 Jacquetta May as Sister Julie Novac (series 2–3)
 Gabrielle Cowburn as Sister Debbie Pereira (series 2–3)

Nurses
 Jayne Charlton McKensie as Staff Nurse Caroline Richards
 Katy Hale as Staff Nurse Susan Betts
 Annie Treadwell as Enrolled Nurse Becky Reece (series 1–2)
 Joyce Falconer as Staff Nurse Tricia 'Whitecoat' Williams (series 1–2)
 Sheila Whitfield as Staff Nurse Lisa Dalton (series 1–2)
 Cassie Stuart as Staff Nurse Jayne Dugas (series 1–2)
 Mandy Matthews as Staff Nurse Pam Charnley (series 2–3)
 Peter Biddle as Charge Nurse Patrick Garden (series 2–3)
 Lisa Harkus as Student Nurse Kirsty Reilly (series 3)

Others
 Frank Mills as Alf Grocott (series 2)
 Nisha Nayar as Nasreen (series 2)
 Chris Woolgar as Chris Pereira (series 2–3)
 James Healey as the Radiographer (series 3)

Characters and storylines

Series 1 

Series 1 follows events in two separate wards of the same hospital, one medical and one surgical, largely through the eyes of junior doctors. Series 1 has six episodes and was originally broadcast between 21 April 1994 and 2 June 1994.

The protagonist is Dr. Andrew Collin (Andrew Lancel), an idealistic junior doctor, straight from medical school, and, initially, a devout Christian. The series opens on his first day at work as a house officer, and in his first scene he proudly admires himself in his white coat, before coming onto the ward, and meeting his new colleague, the frosty but competent SHO Dr. Claire Maitland (Helen Baxendale). Andrew is soon aware that he has almost no idea how to be a doctor, as medical school training has left him grossly ill-prepared. The series follows him in his first few months as a doctor, as he deals with one crisis after another and is increasingly disillusioned with the indifferent care given to patients and the expectations of junior doctors. At one point during the first series, he is required to work a three-day and three night shift on call. Claire, who is more cynical and detached, both explains the realities of medical work to Andrew and tries to shield him from the worst abuses, in order to preserve his sanity.

Claire has the second largest role in series 1. Although her defence mechanisms are generally better than Andrew's and the series seldom shows her as either exhausted or depressed, she claims to Andrew (after euthanising a patient with an overdose of painkillers) that the emotional demands of being a doctor are just as hard on her. Although Claire is normally frosty, the series reveals that this is her professional mask: she quickly becomes friends with Andrew and eventually takes his side in a conflict against her own lover, Simon Bettencourt. In one episode she plays warmly with the young daughter of a friend. In the final episode of the series this girl is brought into the hospital with a chest injury and dies due to the incompetence of another doctor. Afterwards Andrew finds Claire crying in the nurses' office.

Other characters feature prominently in the series, including Dr. Rajesh Rajah, (Ahsen Bhatti), a pleasant but initially incompetent house officer in a surgical ward, who indulges in as many sexual relationships as possible. By the end of series 3 he shows himself to be one of the best and most able doctors in the programme. He faces racism, a topical issue in the NHS in the 1990s. Dr. Monica Broome (Pooky Quesnel) is a surgical SHO and a new mother, who is desperately trying to hold down her demanding job and pass her fellowship exam, despite constant bullying and sexual harassment by her boss Mr. Simon Bettencourt (Danny Webb). At the end of the series, Monica fails her fellowship exam, and after her husband takes her children away from her to live with his mother in law, she takes her own life. While this has a major effect on Raj and on the consultant surgeon Mr. Ernest Docherty (Tom Watson), Bettencourt defends his behaviour unreservedly and shows no remorse.

Series 2 
In series 2, the viewpoint of the series expands to the administrative level, with the demands for efficiency by the administration shown to directly and indirectly lead to a number of deaths. Series 2 has eight episodes and was originally broadcast between 19 April 1995 and 7 June 1995.

At the beginning of series 2, Andrew has just returned to the hospital and is now an SHO. To his chagrin, the consultant physician Dr. Graham Turner (Michael MacKenzie) has a far better relationship with the new house officer Dr. Phil Kirkby (Andrew Clover), whose father went to school with Graham, than he ever did with Andrew. The old boys' public school network and patronage was an effective way to speed career progression in medicine. Phil, despite his recent graduation, is a confident aggressive doctor whose faults contrast with Andrew's in the first series. Rather than being nervous and uncertain, in the first days he attempts diagnoses and treatments for which he is undertrained.

Claire remains an SHO, but her skills and academic performance mean that the hospital is shown to be careful not to drive her off to work elsewhere. She is also working under the far more committed and friendly consultant Dr. Barry Yates (Fred Pearson). She has a brief relationship with the new Australian surgical registrar Mr. Cyril "Scissors" Smedley (Peter O'Brien).

At the organisational level, a new hospital administrator, Paul Tennant (Nicholas Palliser), demands ever more efficiency from the medical staff, placing Andrew on ear nose and throat (ENT) duties even though he has no training in the required skills, and instructing Claire to abandon extended resuscitation of a hypothermia patient in order to fulfil her clinic duties. While Claire is covering for Andrew one night in casualty, a haemophiliac man is brought in with a nosebleed and bleeds to death because Claire is not trained in ENT, no trained staff are available and she cannot stop the bleeding. Claire exposes the systemic failures in the hospital to the media and although this is within her rights as a doctor, she is fired on an unrelated technicality. Claire returns to the hospital as a registrar at the end of the series, after resuscitating a heart attack victim in a pub and being reminded of why she chose to be a doctor.

The hospital soon attracts additional adverse publicity when the anaesthetist Dr. James Mortimer (Jo Dow) is diagnosed with AIDS following the discovery that he has HIV and a Kaposi's sarcoma. James is permitted to continue to work as his speciality does not put patients at risk. Some of the staff, particularly Raj, are sympathetic or actively supportive of James. However, the diagnosis is almost immediately leaked to the media by an unidentified party, another scandal ensues, and manager Tennant pressures James to take leave of absence. However, the payout over the death of the haemophilia patient means that the hospital cannot afford for Mr. Docherty to take his planned retirement, and Docherty demands that the pressure on James to take leave or resign be withdrawn in return for his remaining at the hospital.

The second major medical error in the series contrasts Turner's treatment of his junior staff with Docherty's protection of James. At the end of the second last episode of the series, Running on Vapours, Phil is attempting to draw up chemotherapy doses for a patient on the evening of Christmas Day despite being untrained. He cannot contact a pharmacist, consults with Andrew, who is also untrained in the matter, and finally rings a drunken Dr. Turner at home, who advises him to draw up the treatment. Phil gets the dose wrong and the patient dies of anaphylactic shock. Turner and Tennant both advise Phil to take full blame for the incident and to deny that he sought Turner's opinion, and assure him that in return he will not suffer damage to his career. Phil does so, but the inquest returns a finding of unlawful killing and refers it for a possible manslaughter prosecution.

Series 3 
Series 3 has 13 episodes and was originally broadcast between 2 April 1996 and 25 June 1996. In the third series there is more focus on the patients and the doctors' extended interactions with them. Claire has a friendly relationship with a regular dialysis patient and as a result, pursues families of accident victims about organ donation. Raj becomes affected by the diagnosis of a baby severely injured by shaking and Scissors, whose own wife had been killed by a drunk driver, operates unsuccessfully on a woman injured by a drunk driver and attempts to kill the driver by neglect.

In series 3, the hospital has another new house officer, Dr. Liz Reid (Caroline Trowbridge). Liz is different from both Andrew and Phil: she is shown to be not answering pagers, leaving work in the middle of the day for errands, asking the nurses and orderlies to do procedures for her, blaming colleagues for her own constant mistakes, frequently sighing and rolling her eyes in response to Claire and Andrew's requests and charming her way out of trouble. Claire has little respect for Liz. Their new boss, medical consultant Dr. Sarah Hudson (Selina Cadell), reprimands Claire for frightening Liz with her open contempt: however, Hudson also later confronts Liz over the latter's habit of blaming mistakes on colleagues. Towards the end of the series Claire describes Liz as "mad". Liz eventually breaks down at the end of a very long shift and smashes her pager to pieces, and Andrew breaks into her room to find her crying and screaming at the broken device.

Turner's position becomes less secure. Dr. Hudson assures Claire that Turner's neglect of his duties at the hospital in favour of his private practice has not gone unnoticed. Soon an audit into consultants' attendance begins but the junior doctors quickly find that Turner, as head of the consultants committee, was forewarned. When Turner advises Andrew to attempt the insertion of a temporary pacemaker even though he has only seen it done once, Andrew has to call Claire in. Claire and Andrew make sure the hospital knows that Claire had to come in, off duty and slightly drunk, due to Turner's negligence. Tennant soon has to unofficially caution Turner about his approach to his duties. Phil, now a surgical house officer and facing continual taunting from his new boss Mr. Adrian DeVries (Jack Fortune) about his supposed incompetence, begins to aggressively suggest to Turner that he should be the one facing manslaughter charges over the Series 2 chemotherapy death. Docherty decides to stand against Turner as head of the consultants' committee. Phil confesses the story to Docherty and Docherty brokers a deal with the hospital in which records of the accident are lost and Phil cannot be charged, in return for Turner being removed as head of the committee.

There are continuing public scandals about patient care at the hospital. The hospital has written letters to all patients cared for by James warning them of their possible HIV exposure. The outrage of the patients places further pressure on James to resign. Sister Jackie Landers (Ellen Thomas) speaks on television about bad patient care and is severely reprimanded by Tennant. However, soon Casualty Sister Julie Novac (Jacquetta May) makes similar comments to reporters, and Tennant ends up suspended over her remarks: it is revealed that she is Tennant's estranged wife and that he has protected her to his own cost. After being reinstated following Phil's exoneration, Tennant attempts to have Julie's new partner, Scissors Smedley, fired over procedural errors he committed asking a student nurse to administer intravenous medication to a critically ill child when casualty was understaffed, and fails to protect James from false accusations of child abuse. When Julie finds out both that Scissors had not told her about Tennant's manipulations, and that he had failed to confide in her that his neglect of the drink driver was due to his own wife's death in a similar accident, she breaks up with him.

James's HIV infection also affects Andrew. Andrew has begun an affair with Staff Nurse Caroline Richards (Jayne MacKenzie), whom he dated briefly in Series 1. Caroline's ex-lover Luke (Terry Sue-Patt), was also a partner of James's and Luke has tested positive for HIV, leaving Caroline at risk and Andrew needing to explain to his wife why he might have an infection. After Caroline tests negative, Andrew repeatedly refuses to leave his wife, and Caroline eventually leaves him. At the end of series she reveals to him that she is pregnant.

Towards the end of the series, Adrian DeVries's son, Steven (Christopher Woodger), the result of a past relationship with Sister Debbie Pereira (Gabrielle Cowburn) with whom he had been forming a relationship following the break-up of his marriage, is brought in seriously injured after being hit by a car. DeVries and his team do their utmost to save Steven's life, but sadly to no avail. DeVries is left in tears.

In the last episode of the series, Liz is in a psychiatric ward following a breakdown. Another psychiatric patient is roaming the hospital pretending to be a locum and murdering patients with drug overdoses. He breaks into Liz's room while Andrew is visiting her, and stabs Andrew with a needle containing insulin. Raj rescues Andrew and the casualty team, assisted by the newly reunited Claire and Scissors, attempt to treat him. With Claire asking Andrew if he were to be in a vegetative state, would he want her to euthanise him. The series closes with the team carrying a convulsing Andrew towards a resuscitation room.

Throughout series 3, there is a touching subplot concerning the growing love interest between Mr Docherty and his personal secretary, Mrs Isobel Trimble (Angela Douglas), his attempts to ask her to marry him and their ultimate marriage in the series finale.

Themes

Although billed as a comedy, and darkly humorous in many respects, Cardiac Arrest explores several disturbing themes. It demolishes many cherished concepts of healthcare one after the other, and did not attempt to be politically correct. It attracted complaints from many quarters during its airing, although enjoyed huge support amongst junior doctors.

Racism
Andrew: "Mrs. Singh doesn't speak any English."
Claire: "Then screw her. I'm not a frigging vet." (smiles at Mrs. Singh and exits)

Cardiac Arrest is stark in its portrayal of racist attitudes, which are depicted as endemic throughout the health service. In one episode, an Indian locum who is clearly incompetent is assumed to be so, not because of his deeds, but because he is Indian. In Series 3, Raj is not chosen for a GP training scheme to Docherty's surprise: DeVries calmly reveals that doctors with "foreign" names are never chosen.

Raj is often shown arguing with his mother on the telephone about her desire for him to get married.

Sexism

Female patients and staff are portrayed as subject to continual sexual harassment. Raj and James – who is actually a bisexual man with many male partners – have a "babe alert" system whereby they page other male doctors to come and ogle attractive female patients admitted to casualty. When Claire suggests to a female nurse that she would support a sexual harassment case that the nurse could make against James, the nurse replies that she would lose her job over it.

Homophobia

When the media reveals that James has AIDS, Raj is sympathetic and unsurprised by the revelation of James' sexuality, saying merely that he assumes James acquired HIV via "unprotected sex with an infected woman... or man." He then goes on to explain that he has known for some time and knows that James had to be secretive given the pervasive homophobia of the medical system and community. James is later falsely accused of child abuse after a man who recognised him from media coverage of his infection sees him feeling for a pulse in his son's leg. The father is openly and aggressively homophobic.

Junior doctors
In an early scene, we see several junior doctors smoking in the doctors' office, and Claire commenting that soon someone will say it gives you cancer. This is just one scene where doctors are depicted as acting very far from their cherished public persona.

Andrew is rapidly seen as being the most put-upon person in the hospital. Nurses will not flush venous lines: Andrew must do it. Porters will not transport blood specimens: Andrew must do it. Every menial job seems to default to him, and he rapidly runs out of patience. After three days of continuous duty, Andrew is speaking to a patient's family, breaking bad news. One male relative stands up to Andrew in a threatening manner and says "What sort of doctor are you? You couldn't even be bothered to shave before you came to work today!"

Consultants
Consultants are mostly portrayed as callous and uncaring towards matters of patients and their own staff such as junior doctors, nurses and house officers.

Andrew's consultant, Dr. Turner, at first seems friendly and approachable. However, he never appears on the ward, leaving the treatment of patients to Claire. We see him chatting on the telephone about his golf fixtures. Later he attempts to persuade an exhausted and desperate Andrew to forgo his holiday, bribing him with a good reference for his next job. Finally, he attempts to have Phil take the blame for a medical error that kills a patient.

Both of the younger surgical consultants, Bettencourt and DeVries, are portrayed as aggressive bullies.

The more positive portrayals of consultants are with the portrayals of Dr. Yates, Dr. Hudson and Mr. Docherty, the last being the most notable example of all. Early in the first series Mr. Docherty is portrayed as pleasant and cheerful, but also bumbling and incompetent, frequently requiring to be rescued by Monica. He often loses his way in the middle of a sentence. His characterisation changes slowly as the series progresses. To the point of Mr. Docherty becoming the most notable senior doctor of the programme. Dr. Yates is portrayed as a sympathetic character who, in stark contrast to Turner, genuinely supports his juniors and stays behind to assist them, and more than once is vocal in his opposition to management's tendency to look for a scapegoat for patient deaths caused by systemic flaws. Dr. Hudson is portrayed as a no-nonsense yet scrupulously fair character.

Managers
Managers are portrayed with considerable venom. The Series 1 hospital manager is uncaring and dismissive, even of Andrew's most desperate complaints of abuse:
Manager: "Your contract states that in emergencies you are expected to come to work."
Andrew: "I fail to see how a holiday I booked six weeks ago can be called an emergency!"
Manager: "Hospital managers are accustomed to the disaffection of junior medical staff."

In Series 2 and 3, Tennant is primarily interested in protecting his own job, and that of his ally Dr. Turner, and in improving hospital metrics such as outpatient waiting times, rather than improving working conditions for staff, or care for patients.

Nurses
In Series 1, nurses attract perhaps the cruellest depiction of all. They are frequently shown as gossiping, conniving women, chatting at the nurses' station while ill patients languish without attention, or Andrew fumbles around, hopelessly busy and in great need of assistance.

In Series 2 and 3 senior nurses become participants in storylines and are treated with less caricature and portrayed more positively. One of these is Charge Nurse Patrick "Hanging" Garden (Peter Biddle), although he has his moments of being portrayed negatively, especially during the second series where is one of the most unsympathetic towards James and opines that he should be sacked.

Many nurses have suggestive nicknames, such as "Nurse White-Coat" (Joyce Falconer), so called because she would apparently sleep with "anyone in a white coat".

Medical ethos
In common with other medical dramas, (such as The House of God or even M*A*S*H), Cardiac Arrest portrays junior hospital medicine as an unending parade of sexual adventure for the staff, partly because longer-term relationships are placed under enormous stress by their working hours. Very few characters are in stable relationships. In the first series, among the junior doctors, only Monica is married. Later, even this relationship breaks down, and Monica eventually takes her own life. By the second series, Andrew is married but shortly begins an affair with his old girlfriend Caroline. Claire has relationships with several of the surgeons: Simon Bettencourt, Cyril Smedley, and Adrian DeVries.

Training 

The series is extremely critical of medical training. Claire and Mr. Docherty, both sympathetic characters, repeatedly discuss in detail that medical training is unduly demanding of junior doctors and that both the knowledge and training needed are increasing without recognition or appropriate supervision. At the end of the first series Docherty directly addresses the question of hazing practices in medical training when Bettencourt tries to defend his treatment of Monica by saying that he went through a similar process.

Junior medicine is portrayed as a school of hard knocks, where junior doctors achieve success and skill over the corpses of their mistakes. They achieve promotions and status by underhand means. No-one is supportive to anyone else's problems.

Production 

Cardiac Arrest was produced by Island World. It had envisaged creating a sitcom set in a hospital, but when Jed Mecurio responded to its advertisement for a writer the show became a portrait of the NHS from the perspective of junior doctors. Series 1 and 2 were filmed on location at both Ruchill Hospital and Stobhill Hospital in Glasgow.

Mercurio appears briefly in a cameo role in series 3 where he plays a friend of Raj's called Baz.

Episodes

Series 1 (1994)

Series 2 (1995)

Series 3 (1996)

Reception 

The critical response to the series was generally positive; it was twice nominated for Best Original TV Drama Series/Serial by the Writers' Guild of Great Britain and twice in the same category by BAFTA Scotland.

Doctors were reported as finding the series to be representative of life in an NHS hospital. In a 1999 survey of British doctors' attitude to television depiction of their profession, 15% of doctors voted for Claire Maitland as the fictional doctor they would most like to be compared with. When the series had not yet been released on DVD, an online forum for doctors ran a campaign for its release. The Royal College of Nursing however complained that it portrayed nurses as witless and callous. Virginia Bottomley, the Health Secretary at the time of airing, described it as closer to a Carry On film than a drama. During the height of the controversy Jed Mercurio wrote a letter to the newsletter accompanying the British Medical Journal claiming that most of his criticism came from "retired old consultants", but says he has since decided that much of the controversy was a media creation.

Notably, the series originated the medical term "killing season" for the supposed association between newly qualified doctors starting hospital practice and an increase in medical errors and mortality, which data do not support. In 1994, the British Medical Journal concluded that, "newly qualified house officers have been falsely accused of increasing the number of deaths in hospital and that the idea of the killing season is very much fiction. A 2009 Imperial College London study of records for 300,000 patients at 170 hospitals in the years between 2000 and 2008 found that death rates were 6% higher on Black Wednesday than the previous Wednesday.

DVD release

The complete series was released as a five-disc DVD set, Cardiac Arrest: The Complete Collection, on 16 April 2007. The DVD contains all three series, but no extras such as commentary.

References

External links
 
 
 British Film Institute Screen Online

BBC television dramas
1990s British medical television series
1990s British drama television series
1994 British television series debuts
1996 British television series endings
Television shows set in the West Midlands (county)
BBC controversies